Puerto Rico competed at the 1976 Summer Olympics in Montreal, Quebec, Canada. 80 competitors, 73 men and 7 women, took part in 74 events in 12 sports.

Medalists

Bronze
 Orlando Maldonado — Boxing, Men's Light Flyweight (– 48 kg)

Archery

In the second time the nation competed in archery at the Olympics, Puerto Rico entered one man and one woman.  Maria Medina came in last place in the women's competition even as Edgardo Berdeguer beat considerably the 55th-place finish Puerto Rico's only archer in 1972 earned.

Women's Individual Competition:
 Maria Medina – 1993 points (→ 27th place)

Men's Individual Competition:
 Edgardo Berdeguer – 2200 points (→ 31st place)

Athletics

Men's 800 metres
 Jorge Ortiz
 Heat — 1:51.38 (→ did not advance)

Men's 4x400 metres Relay
 Pedro Ferrer, Iván Mangual, Julio Ferrer, and Jorge Ortiz
 Heat — 3:06.08 (→ did not advance)

Men's 400m Hurdles
 Julio Ferrer
 Heats — 52.45s
 Semi Final — 51.04s (→ did not advance)

Men's Marathon
 José de Jesus — 2:19:34 (→ 23rd place)
 Víctor Serrano — 2:34:59 (→ 53rd place)

Basketball

Men's team competition
Preliminary round (group B):
 Lost to Yugoslavia (63-84)
 Lost to United States (94-95)
 Lost to Czechoslovakia (83-89)
 Lost to Italy (81-95)
 Defeated Egypt (20-0) bb.
Classification Matches:
 9th/11th place: Defeated Japan (111-91)
 9th/10th place: Defeated Mexico (89-84) → Ninth place

Team roster
Butch Lee
Michael Vicens
Neftali Rivera
Luis Brignoni
Rubén Rodríguez
Roberto Alvarez
Héctor Blondet
Jimmy Thordsen
Mariano Ortíz
Teófilo Cruz
Raymond Dalmau
Earl Brown
Head coach: Tom Nissalke

Boxing

Men's Light Flyweight (– 48 kg)
 Orlando Maldonado →  Bronze Medal
 First Round – Defeated Lucky Mutale (ZAM), walk-over
 Second Round – Defeated Brendan Dunne (IRL), KO-1
 Quarterfinals – Defeated Héctor Patri (ARG), 5:0
 Semifinals – Lost to Jorge Hernández (CUB), 0:5

Men's Flyweight (– 51 kg)
Julio Guzman

Men's Bantamweight (– 54 kg)
Alejandro Silva

Men's Featherweight (– 57 kg)
Carlos Calderon

Men's Lightweight (– 60 kg)
Roberto Andino

Men's Light-Welterweight (– 63.5 kg)
Ismael Martínez

Men's Welterweight (– 67 kg)
Carlos Santos

Men's Light-Middleweight (– 71 kg)
Wilfredo Guzman

Men's Middleweight (– 75 kg)
Carlos Betancourt

Men's Light-Heavyweight (– 81 kg)
José Rosa

Equestrianism

Fencing

Four fencers, three men and one woman, represented Puerto Rico in 1976.

Men's foil
 José Samalot

Men's épée
 Gilberto Peña
 Rubén Hernández

Women's foil
 Dinorah Enríquez

Judo

Sailing

Shooting

Swimming

Men's 100 metres Freestyle
Fernando Cañales

Men's 200 metres Freestyle
Francisco Cañales

Men's 400 metres Freestyle
Francisco Cañales

Men's 100 metres Backstroke
Carlos Berrocal
 
Men's 200 metres Backstroke
Carlos Berrocal

Men's 100 metres Breaststroke
Carlos Nazario

Men's 200 metres Breaststroke
Orlando Catinchi
Carlos Nazario

Men's 100 metres Butterfly
Arnaldo Pérez
John Daly

Men's 200 metres Butterfly
John Daly

Men's 400 metres Individual Medley
José-Ricardo de Jesús

Men's 4×200 metres Freestyle Relay
Fernando Cañales
José-Ricardo de Jesús
Arnaldo Pérez
Francisco Cañales

Men's 4×100 metres Medley Relay
Carlos Berrocal
Carlos Nazario
John Daly
Fernando Cañales

Women's 100 metres Freestyle
Jane Fayer

Women's 200 metres Freestyle
Jane Fayer

Women's 400 metres Freestyle
Diana Hatler

Women's 800 metres Freestyle
Diana Hatler

Women's 100 metres Breaststroke
Angela López

Women's 200 metres Breaststroke
Angela López

Women's 100 metres Butterfly
María Mock

Women's 200 metres Butterfly
María Mock

Women's 4×100 metres Freestyle Relay
Diana Hatler
Angela López
María Mock
Jane Fayer

Women's 4×100 metres Medley Relay
Diana Hatler
Angela López
María Mock
Jane Fayer

Weightlifting

Wrestling

References

External links
Official Olympic Reports
International Olympic Committee results database

Nations at the 1976 Summer Olympics
1976 Summer Olympics
1976 in Puerto Rican sports